Shitalanatha was the tenth tirthankara of the present age according to Jainism. According to Jain beliefs, he became a siddha, a liberated soul which has destroyed all of its karma. Jains believe Shitalanatha was born to King Dradhrath and Queen Nanda at Bhaddilpur into the Ikshvaku dynasty. His birth date was the twelfth day of the Magha Krishna month of the Indian national calendar. Shitalanatha is associated with Svastika (Dig.)/ Srivatasa (Svet.) emblem, Pilurikha tree, Brahma Yaksha and Manavi (Dig.) & Ashoka (Svet.) Yakshi.

Biography
Shitalanatha was the tenth tirthankara of the present age according to Jainism. According to Jain beliefs, he became a siddha, a liberated soul which has destroyed all of its karma. Jains believe Shitalanatha was born to King Dradhrath and Queen Nanda at Bhaddilpur into the Ikshvaku dynasty. His birth date was the twelfth day of the Magha Krishna month of the Indian national calendar. Shitalanatha is associated with Svastika (Dig.)/ Srivatasa (Svet.) emblem, Pilurikha tree, Brahma Yaksha and Manavi (Dig.) & Ashoka (Svet.) Yakshi.

Main Temple
 Shitalanatha Temple, Kolkata

See also

God in Jainism
Arihant (Jainism)
Jainism and non-creationism

Notes

References
 
 

Tirthankaras
Solar dynasty